Giorgi Sharabidze is a Georgian professional basketball who plays for Tskhum-Abkhazeti. He has also played for Feni Industries of the Macedonian First League.

References

External links
 Giorgi Sharabidze Player Profile, Tskhum-Abkhazeti, News, Stats - Eurobasket
 Giorgi Sharabidze Player Profile, Tskhum-Abkhazeti, International Stats, Events Stats, Game Logs, Awards - RealGM

1990 births
Living people
BC Körmend players
Centers (basketball)
Men's basketball players from Georgia (country)
People from Baghdati
Valencia Basket players